Adam Baker may refer to:

Adam J. Baker (1821–1912), Canadian politician
Adam Baker (footballer) (born 1993), English footballer
Adam Baker, founder of the band, Annuals
Adam Baker, entrepreneur and founder of Blottr
Adam Baker, fictional character in the TV movie The Users